NSAR may refer to:
 Nova Scotia Association of Realtors, an association for realtors in the Canadian province of Nova Scotia
 SARK, or NSAR (Navy Search and Rescue), a folding knife designed by Ernest Emerson

See also
 SEC filing